Maino is a periodic stream in Angola. It is located in the province of Bengo, in the northwestern part of the country, 180 km east of the capital Luanda.

References

Rivers of Angola